Walter Green Penty FRIBA (19 June 1852 – 23 January 1902) was an architect working in York, England.

Family
He was born in Gate Fulford the son of Thomas Penty (1827-1893) and Maria Green (1831-1863). He married Emma Seller (1847-1937) on 2 September 1872 at St Lawrence's Church, York  and they had the following children:
Horace Seller Penty (1874-1930)
Arthur Joseph Penty (1875-1937) - also an architect
Edith Maria Penty (1876-1943)
Frederick Thomas Penty (1879-1943) - also an architect
Gertrude Mary Penty (1882-1957)
Percy Walter Penty (1884-1955)
George Victor Penty (1885-1967) - emigrated to Australia
Charles Bertram Penty (1886-1957)
Lance Corporal Sidney Wallace Penty (1890-1918)

Career
He studied as a pupil of George Styan, the City Engineer of York from 1867 to 1871. He commenced independent practice in York in 1873. He was for a time in partnership with George Benson, but this was dissolved in 1890.  He went into partnership with his son Arthur Joseph Penty in 1898 as Penty and Penty.

He was appointed surveyor of the York Union Rural Sanitary Authority in 1876. 

He was first president of the York Architectural Association when it was formed in 1882, and elected for a second period of two years in 1888. 

Penty's first commission was the Burnholme Social Club in Heworth, York. He also designed the new Lighthorseman pub at the junction of Fulford Road and New Walk Terrace in the 1870s.  A previous pub with that name on that site appears on the 1852 Ordnance Survey map of York.  He designed Botterill's Horse Repository in Tanner's Moat (of which two arches survive) around 1880.  This was a sort of 'garage' for horses of gentlemen who had ridden into the city to stay, possibly to go on the railway.  In the 1890s, Arthur joined his father to form the firm of Penty & Penty.  Among other works, they built the Terry Memorial almshouses in Skeldergate in 1899, and a number of streets in the Clementhorpe area of York, before Arthur left the city to work in London.

In 1883 he was elected councillor for the Walmgate Ward and served for a period of 1 year.

He was elected a Fellow of the Royal Institute of British Architects in 11 March 1889.

Works

Private house, “Burnholme”, nr. York (later Burnholme Social Club, demolished ca. 2014)
Bellarby and Son Cigar Works, Coney Street, York 1874 
New Schools and Schoolmaster’s House, Melbourne, East Riding of Yorkshire 1877 
St Saviour's Church, York, vestry, 1878
Private house for Thomas Liversedge, “Brooklands”, 28 Leeds Road, Selby, 1883-84
York Institute of Art, Science and Literature, 12 Clifford Street, York 1883-85
Walker’s Horse Repository, Tanner's Moat, York 1884 
York Liberal Club 1888
Terrace of houses, 1-9 The Avenue, York 1880-90
Lodging House for The York Coffee House Company, 114 Walmgate, York ca. 1890
New Pavilion, York Cricket Club 1892
The Bay Horse public house, Marygate, York 1893-94
29 Trinity Lane, York 1895 (extension)
Leetham’s flour rolling mills, Rowntree Wharf, Navigation Road, York 1896
The Other Tap and Spile public house, 15 North Street, York 1896
Black House public house, 29 Monkgate, York 1897
Old Grey Mare public house, Clifton Green, York (alterations)
New Laundry, York Workhouse 1898-99
Terry Memorial almshouses, Skeldergate 1899
Elm Bank, The Mount, York 1900-01 (remodelling)

References

1852 births
1902 deaths
People from York
19th-century English architects
Architects from Yorkshire
Fellows of the Royal Institute of British Architects